The Ambassador of the United Kingdom to Senegal is the United Kingdom's foremost diplomatic representative in the Republic of Senegal.

Senegal was under French influence in the 19th century, and from 1895 was included in the colonial federation of French West Africa. The early representatives of the UK government were unpaid Frenchmen; the first British official arrived in 1894. Senegal gained independence from France in 1960.

List of heads of mission

Vice-Consul at Dakar
1872–1879: Cléomenes Pillot
1879–1887: Ernest Simon Montoux
1887–1888: Edouard Rastoul
1888–1894: Pierre Gaston Faoche
1894–1896: Allan Maclean

Consul at Dakar
1896–1897: Allan Maclean
1897–1902: Leonard Arthur
1902–1905: Charles Cromie, for French West Africa and for Republic of Liberia

Consul-General at Dakar for French West Africa
1905–1908: Charles Cromie
1908–1909: John Baldwin, for French West Africa except Dahomey, also for Togoland and Portuguese Guinea
1909–1916: Charles Wallis, ditto
1916–1928: Reginald Maugham (acting 1916–20), also for Portuguese Guinea
1928–1931: Eric Buxton, ditto
1931–1940: Victor Cusden, ditto
July 1940–Jan 1943: Post closed (Vichy administration in Dakar)
1943–1945: William Meiklereid
1945–1951: Hector Henderson
1951–1954: Donal Cameron
1954–1956: Frank Butler
1956–1959: Alan Oldham
1959–1960: Adam Watson, also for Portuguese Guinea

Ambassador Extraordinary and Plenipotentiary to the Republic of Senegal
1960–1962: Adam Watson, also to Mali, Mauritania, Togo
1962–1966: John Peck, also to Mauritania
1966–1971: John Tahourdin, also to Mauritania, Mali, Guinea
1971–1973: Ivor Porter, ditto
1973–1976: Denzil Dunnett, ditto
1976–1979: John Powell-Jones, also to Mali, Mauritania, Guinea, Cape Verde, Guinea-Bissau
1979–1982: William Squire, ditto
1982–1985: Laurence O'Keeffe, ditto
1985–1990: John Macrae, ditto
1990–1993: Roger Beetham, also to Mali, Guinea, Cape Verde, Guinea-Bissau
1993–1997: Alan Furness, ditto
1997–2000: David Snoxell, ditto
2000–2004: Edward Alan Burner, also to Mali, Guinea-Bissau, Cape Verde
2004–2006: Peter Newall, ditto
2007–2011: Christopher Trott, ditto
2011–2015: John Marshall, also Guinea-Bissau, Cape Verde
2015–2019: George Hodgson, also Guinea-Bissau, Cape Verde
2019–2022: Victoria Billing, also Guinea-Bissau, Cape Verde

2022–present: Juliette John, also Guinea-Bissau, Cape Verde

References

External links
UK and Senegal, gov.uk

Senegal
 
United Kingdom